Martha Wainwright is the debut album of Montreal singer Martha Wainwright, released on April 12, 2005. The album received generally favourable reviews.

Track listing 
All tracks by Martha Wainwright except where noted.

 "Far Away" – 2:54
 "G.P.T." – 2:44
 "Factory" – 3:32
 "These Flowers" – 4:11
 "Ball & Chain" – 3:18
 "Don't Forget" – 4:11
 "This Life" – 6:01
 "When the Day Is Short" – 3:46
 "Bloody Mother Fucking Asshole" – 3:14
 "TV Show" – 4:09
 "The Maker" – 4:08 Martha Wainwright,*Jon Carin
 "Who Was I Kidding?" – 4:10
 "Whither Must I Wander" (Robert Louis Stevenson, Ralph Vaughan Williams) – 2:47

Special edition bonus tracks 
From the five-song EP, I Will Internalize, also released by MapleMusic, and which preceded the full album release. Songs excluded from the special edition were "I Will Internalize" and "New York, New York, New York".
 "Bring Back My Heart" (featuring Rufus Wainwright) – 3:17
 "Baby" – 3:56
 "Dis, quand reviendras-tu?" (Barbara) – 4:10

Personnel 
 Martha Wainwright – vocals, electric guitar (track 11), guitar, producer
 Cameron Greider – electric guitar (tracks 1, 3, 5, 8, 10, and 11)
 Bill Dobrow – drums (tracks 1–3, 5, 8, 10, and 11)
 Brad Albetta – bass guitar (tracks 1, 3, 6, 7, and 11), upright bass (track 9), Moog bass (track 4), keyboards (tracks 3, 4, 6, and 7), Rhodes (track 9), electric guitar (track 3)
 Joe McGinty – piano (tracks 1 and 7), keyboards (tracks 7 and 11)
 Jeff Hill – bass guitar (track 2)
 Tom Mennier – piano (tracks 2–5, 10, 13) keyboards (track 2), Wurlitzer (track 3), background vocals (track 4)
 Jane Scarpantoni – cello (track 2)
 Lily Lanken – background vocals (tracks 2, 4, 5, 8, and 10)
 Dan Reiser – drums (track 3)
 Kate McGarrigle – banjo (track 3), piano (track 6)
 Erin Hill – harp (tracks 4 and 13)
 Garth Hudson – organ (track 4), keyboards (track 12), alto saxophone (track 12)
 Rufus Wainwright – background vocals (track 6)
 Alan Besozi – percussion (track 6)
 Dan Albetta – electric guitar (track 7)
 JC Hopkins – electric guitar (track 7)
 Disco D – drum programming (track 7)
 Paul Bryan – bass (tracks 5 and 8)

Charts

References 

2005 debut albums
Martha Wainwright albums
MapleMusic Recordings albums